Seneca mythology refers to the mythology of the Seneca people, one of the six nations of the Iroquois Confederacy from the northeastern United States.

Figures
Some important figures in Seneca mythology are:

 Eagentci, whose name translates as "ancient-bodied one", is the Earth-mother, or First Mother. Her Huron name is Atahensic.
 Djieien was a man-sized spider who survived most attacks because its heart was buried underground.
 Djodi'kwado' was a horned serpent
 Dagwanoenyent is a vicious northern witch who is depicted as a whirlwind.  Her child's father killed her.
 Gaasyendietha is a fire-breathing dragon that inhabits Lake Ontario.
 Hagondes is a cannibalistic trickster and clown spirit.
 Kaakwha (also Kanawha) is the solar deity and god of light and truth, subordinate to Hawenniyo, a fertility god.
 Dahdahwat are animals who appear in dreams and visions.
 Gagqa is the crow spirit.
 Awaeh Tegendji is an old woman who lives with her three beautiful daughters.
 Gijesa are spirits of the night sky.
 Hadowe are the Iroquois' equivalent of Dryads.

See also
 Iroquois mythology

References

Iroquois mythology
Seneca tribe